T2 Temporal Prover is an automated program analyzer developed in the Terminator research project at Microsoft Research.

Overview
T2 aims to find whether a program can run infinitely (called a termination analysis). It supports nested loops and recursive functions, pointers and side-effects, and function-pointers as well as concurrent programs. Like all programs for termination analysis it tries to solve the halting problem for particular cases, since the general problem is undecidable. It provides a solution which is sound, meaning that when it states that a program does always terminate, the result is dependable.

The source code is licensed under MIT License and hosted on GitHub.

References

Further reading

External links
 T2 Temporal Logic Prover on GitHub
 T2: Temporal Property Verification publication at Microsoft Research
 

Free and open-source software
Microsoft free software
Microsoft Research
Software that uses Mono (software)
Software using the MIT license